3D-Jury is a metaserver that aggregates and compares models from various protein structure prediction servers.  It takes in groups of predictions made by a collection of servers and assigns each pair a 3D-Jury score, based on structural similarity.  The score is generated by counting the number of Cα atoms in the two predictions within 3.5 Å of each other after being superpositioned.  To improve accuracy of the final model, users can select the prediction servers from which to aggregate results.

The Robetta automatic protein structure prediction server incorporates 3D-Jury into its prediction pipeline.

References

External links
 BioInfoBank Meta Server 3D-Jury web interface

Bioinformatics
Protein structure